The 1962 Temple Owls football team was an American football team that represented Temple University as a member of the Middle Atlantic Conference (MAC) during the 1962 NCAA College Division football season. In its third season under head coach George Makris, the team compiled a 3–6 record (2–3 against MAC opponents) and finished fourth out of seven teams in the MAC's University Division. The team played its home games at Temple Stadium in Philadelphia.

Schedule

References

Temple
Temple Owls football seasons
Temple Owls football